Bobby Flavell may refer to:

Bobby Flavell (English footballer) (1956–1996)
Bobby Flavell (Scottish footballer) (1921–2005)